Lonavala (ISO: Loṇāvaḷā) is a hill station town and a Municipal Council in the Pune district, Maharashtra, India. It is known for its production of the hard candy chikki and is also a major stop on the railway line connecting Mumbai and Pune. From the Pune suburbs, local trains are available from Pune Junction. Both the Mumbai-Pune Expressway as well as the Mumbai-Bengaluru highway pass through Lonavala.

Lonavala is also home to INS Shivaji (formerly HMIS Shivaji) which is the Indian Navy's Premier Technical Training Institute. On 16 Feb 1945, the Establishment was commissioned as HMIS Shivaji and since then, the premier Technical Training Establishment of the Indian Navy trains officers.

Etymology
The name Lonavala derives from Leni (Prakrit, A resting place carved from stone) and Avali (Prakrit, series). Lonavali in Prakrit is a place that has a series of such Lenis around it.

History
Present day Lonavala was a part of the Seuna (Yadava) dynasty. Later, the Mughals realised the strategic importance of the region and kept the region for an extended time. The forts in the region and the "Mavala" warriors played an important role in the history of the Maratha Empire and that of the Peshwas.
In 1871, the Lonavala and Khandala hill stations were discovered by Lord Elphinstone, who was the Governor of Bombay Presidency at the time.

Politics
The President of Lonavala Municipal Council is Smt. Surekha Nandkumar Jadhav and the Vice president is Shri. Sanjay Mohan Ghone.

Demographics
 India census,  Lonavala had a population of 57,698. Males constituted 53.47% of the population and females 46.53%. The sex ratio in Lonavala is 870, lower than the state average of 929. Lonavala has a literacy rate of 89.33%, which is higher than the state average of 82.34%. The Male literacy rate is 93.4%, and the female literacy rate is 84.57%. 10.37% of the total population in Lonavala is of children under 6 years of age.

Climate

Tourism
Tourism peaks during the monsoon season. The name Lonavala is derived from the words leni' which means caves and 'avali' which means series. i.e. 'a series of Caves' which is a reference to the many caves like Karla Caves, Bhaja Caves and Bedsa that are close to Lonavala. A trip to Lonavala and Khandala can be combined with sight-seeing visits of Karla, Bhaja and Bedsa caves and also the two fortresses, Lohagad and Visapur. Another place of interest is the Tungi fort, one of the forts captured by Malik Ahmad near the village of Karjat and was known for its natural strength. The Andharban trek begins from village Pimpri, passes through dense forests, valleys and waterfalls and ends in Bhira.

Transport

By road
Lonavala is on the Mumbai-Pune Expressway and is well-connected to several towns of Khopoli, Karjat, Talegaon Dabhade, etc.

By train

Lonavala is well-connected by train. Local trains run from Pune at 2-hour intervals. Those originating from Mumbai along the central line have Khopoli as their last station. Buses are available at regular intervals to complete the remaining 15 km of the journey to Lonavla from Khopoli bus station. 
It takes 2.5 hours by train from Mumbai and 1 to 1.5 hour from Pune. All trains, travelling between Mumbai and Pune, halt at Lonavala. Before the push-pull technology, trains from Mumbai used to halt at Karjat in Raigad District to attach banker locomotives before the train started the journey up the western ghats to reach Lonavala.

By air
Lonavla does not have an airport, though the Indian Air Force station is situated on the way to Aamby Valley City. The city of Aamby Valley has its own private airport. The nearest commercial airports are Pune International Airport at 64 km and Chhatrapati Shivaji Maharaj International Airport at 104 km. A seaplane service is also available between Juhu and Pawana Dam, which is 14 km away from Lonavala.

 Places of interest around Lonavala and Khandala 

 Rajmachi Point 
Rajmachi Point is located about 6.5 km from Lonavala. This point commands a view of Shivaji Maharaj's fort, Rajmachi (Royal terrakouioce), and the surrounding valley. Regular State Transport buses ply between Rajmachi Point and Lonavala from the State Transport Bus Stand. The Vaghjai Dari is also located here.

 Rajmachi Fort 
Rajmachi Fort is a historic fort close to Lonavala and attracts a lot of trekkers during the monsoon season. The fort also comprises two other forts - Shrivardhan Fort and Manaranjan Fort. Besides, the fort is known for the fireflies that lit up the surroundings in night

 Ryewood Park & Shivaji Udyan 
This is an extensive garden situated in Lonavla. The garden has a number of tall trees - some of which are very old. There is an old Shiva temple in the park.

 Valvan Dam 
Valvan Dam is a Britisher-built garden and is more than a century old. This dam has a garden at the foot of its wall and is 2 km from the town. The dam supplies water to the Khopoli power station at the foothills of the Sahyadris for generating electricity. The Kundali River feeds into the dam's reservoir.

 Della Adventure Park 
Della Adventure Park is India's largest adventure park situated in Lonavala hill station. The park is spread over an area of 36 acres. It is located at about 3,000 feet height above MSL. Della Adventure Park offers close to 52 adventure activities.

 Lonavala Lake 
Lonavala Lake is surrounded by natural scenery, about 1.6  km from the town. The lake dries up during the winter and summer months offering an expanse of green grass that is used by walkers and joggers. This place attracts tourists for its street food, including convenience food items like smoked corn on the cob, shaved ice (gola), vada pav, chaat, and hot ginger tea.

 Duke's Nose 
Duke's Nose stands 12 km from Lonavla, clearly visible from the highway while driving towards Mumbai. This landmark in Khandala is visited by hikers. Also known locally as Naagphani'' (Cobra's Hood), the cliff owes its name to the Duke of Wellington, whose ample nose it resembles.

 Tiger's Leap 

Tiger's Leap also known as Tiger's Point''' is a cliff-top with a sheer drop of over 650 m, giving an extensive view. Buses are available up to INS Shivaji and the remaining distance of about 1.6  km has to be covered on foot. Legend has it that while being chased by a tiger once, the Maratha Empire king Shivaji jumped into a ditch on the hill and the tiger leaped off it into the valley giving it the name of tiger's leap.

Just around the tiger's leap, there is a small waterfall active only during the monsoon. It serves the purpose of relaxing in the water better than Bushi dam, as the force of the fall is higher. Also, after the brief steep descent, the fall becomes a stream with a fair amount of force to go all the way down to the base of the Tiger's Leap. Adventurers can trek down the stream whilst intermittently stepping back on land where the water current is too strong and the fall is steep.

Karla Caves 
Karla Caves, located near Lonavala, is a complex of cave shrines built by Buddhist monks around 3rd to 2nd century B.C. A temple of Goddess Ekvira Devi is also present here.

Lohagad Fort 
A robust climb of about 11.2 km from Malavali railway station takes you to the 'Iron Fort', once a formidable battle-station of Shivaji. The fort commands a view of the surrounding hills and hamlets.

Visapur Fort 
Adjacent to the Lohagad fort lies the visapur fort which is part of the Lohagad-Visapur fortification. Visapur Fort is larger and at a higher elevation than its twin- Lohagad. It was built during 1713-1720 CE by Balaji Vishwanath.

Bhushi Dam 
A waterfall near the dam is located between Lonavala and I.N.S. Shivaji. Buses running on the I.N.S. Shivaji Road stop here.

Lion Point 
This is a viewpoint midway between Bhushi Dam and Aamby Valley which overlooks a deep valley and mountains known for its roasted corn and onion fritters. This point does not have any lions but is named so because it is associated with the Lions Club of Lonavala.

Narayani Dham 

Narayani Dham is a temple constructed in 2002 in honor of the Hindu Goddess Narayani. It is at a distance of 2 km from the Lonavla railway station. The temple has idols of Durga Mata, Salasar Balaji (Hanuman) and Ganapati housed in a marble structure.

Tungarli Dam 
This lake and Dam comes to life during the Monsoon season, where some people climb the mountain top to the Dam. This dam was built during the British era and features a serene surrounding of trees and hillocks.

Shooting Point 
Another viewpoint in the town of Khandala (Bazaar peth), provides views of the Rajmachi Fort and the valley. Also the home for the St. Mary's villa.

Kataldhar Lonavla 
Kataldhar is a waterfall neer Rajmachi Fort off the Rajmachi Trekking route.

Education 

Some major educational institutes in Lonavala are:
 Sinhgad Institute of technology Lonavala
 The Cathedral Vidya School, Lonavala
 Ryewood International School, Lonavala
 Gurukul High School (boarding school)
 Auxilium Convent School
 Don Bosco School and Junior college, Lonavala
 Adv. Bapusaheb Bhonde High School, Lonavala 
 Samundra Institute of Maritime Studies (SIMS)
 Kohinoor Business School-Kohinoor Global Campus
 DC High School and Jr. College
 Dr. B.N. Purandare Vidyalay High School
 Institute For Future Education Entrepreneurship And Leadership
 V.P.S. HighSchool
 D.P. Mehata Jr College
 Kaivalyadhama Health and Yoga Research Center
 Kendriya Vidyalaya, INS Shivaji, Lonavala
 Sadhana Institute, Old Khandala Road, Lonavala
 Kaivalya Vidya Niketan, Kaivalyadhama Lonavala. CBSE Board
 The Great Eastern Institute Of Maritime Studies, Lonavala
 Society of Saint Mary Virgin in India, Shanti Sadan School Lonavala

Gallery

References

External links

Cities and towns in Pune district
Hill stations in Maharashtra
Tourism in Maharashtra
Lonavala-Khandala